Mfamsibili Tibonisele Mnisi (born 15 August 1972) is a Swazi boxer. He competed in the men's light flyweight event at the 1992 Summer Olympics.

References

External links
 

1972 births
Living people
Light-flyweight boxers
Swazi male boxers
Olympic boxers of Eswatini
Boxers at the 1992 Summer Olympics
Place of birth missing (living people)